John Lewis 'Jake' Foster (11 May 1931 – 28 January 2013) was an Australian water polo player. He competed at the 1952 Summer Olympics and the 1956 Summer Olympics.

His daughter Margot won a bronze in the women's coxed four event at the 1984 Summer Olympics in Los Angeles and son Peter won the bronze medal in the K-2 1000 m kayaking event at the 1988 Summer Olympics in Seoul.

References

1931 births
2013 deaths
Australian male water polo players
Olympic water polo players of Australia
Water polo players at the 1952 Summer Olympics
Water polo players at the 1956 Summer Olympics
Place of birth missing